Katarzyna Pawłowska (born 16 August 1989) is a Polish road racing and track cyclist, who most recently rode for Belgian amateur team . She won the women's scratch race at the UCI Track Cycling World Championships in 2012 and 2013, and competed for her country in the road race at the 2012 Summer Olympics, finishing eleventh.

Major results
Source:

Road

2009
 3rd Time trial, National Road Championships
2012
 1st  Road race, National Road Championships
 1st Pollinkhove Criterium
 3rd Ronde van 't Ginneken
2013
 National Road Championships
1st  Time trial
3rd Road race
 1st Overall Tour Féminin en Limousin
1st Stages 3 & 4
 3rd Grand Prix cycliste de Gatineau
 4th Overall Grand Prix Elsy Jacobs
 5th Grand Prix de Dottignies
 5th Ronde van Gelderland
 7th Overall Tour de Bretagne Féminin
1st Mountains classification
1st Stage 3
 7th Gooik–Geraardsbergen–Gooik
2014
 2nd Time trial, National Road Championships
 3rd Open de Suède Vårgårda TTT
 5th Holland Hills Classic
 7th Durango-Durango Emakumeen Saria
2015
 2nd  Team time trial, UCI Road World Championships
 3rd Time trial, National Road Championships
 5th Ronde van Gelderland
2016
 1st Crescent Vårgårda UCI Women's WorldTour TTT
 Tour Cycliste Féminin International de l'Ardèche
1st Stages 1 & 2
 2nd Time trial, National Road Championships
 8th Time trial, UEC European Road Championships
 8th Gran Premio Bruno Beghelli Internazionale Donne Elite
 9th Time trial, UCI Road World Championships
2017
 1st  Time trial, National Road Championships
 1st Stage 2 (TTT) Healthy Ageing Tour
 Tour Cycliste Féminin International de l'Ardèche
1st Stages 1 & 2
 7th Time trial, UEC European Road Championships
2018
 1st  Sprints classification Emakumeen Euskal Bira
 2nd Time trial, National Road Championships
 5th Cadel Evans Great Ocean Road Race

Track

2010
 1st  Points race, National Track Championships
 2nd  Team pursuit, UEC European Under-23 Track Championships (with Renata Dąbrowska and Małgorzata Wojtyra)
2011
 1st  Points race, National Track Championships
 2nd  Scratch, 2011–12 UCI Track Cycling World Cup, Cali
 2nd  Points race, UEC European Track Championships
 UEC European Under-23 Track Championships
2nd  Individual pursuit
2nd  Team pursuit (with Eugenia Alickun and Małgorzata Wojtyra)
3rd  Points race
2012
 1st  Scratch, UCI Track World Championships
 National Track Championships
1st  Individual pursuit
1st  Omnium
1st  Points race
1st  Scratch
 2nd  Points race, 2011–12 UCI Track Cycling World Cup, Beijing
 UEC European Track Championships
2nd  Team pursuit (with Małgorzata Wojtyra & Eugenia Bujak)
3rd  Omnium
2013
 1st  Scratch, UCI Track World Championships
 National Track Championships
1st  Individual pursuit
1st  Omnium
 2012–13 UCI Track Cycling World Cup, Aguascalientes
1st  Points race
1st  Individual pursuit
 1st Points race, Grand Prix of Poland
 2nd  Team pursuit, UEC European Track Championships (with Eugenia Bujak, Małgorzata Wojtyra & Edyta Jasińska)
2014
 Panevezys
1st Scratch
2nd Individual pursuit
2nd Omnium
 Grand Prix Galichyna
1st Omnium
1st Scratch
2nd Individual pursuit
 2nd  Scratch, UCI Track World Championships
 International Track Women & Men
2nd Omnium
2nd Points race
3rd Scratch
2015
 1st  Points race, UEC European Track Championships
 Grand Prix Galichyna
1st Omnium
1st Points race
1st Scratch
2016
 1st  Points race, UCI Track World Championships
 Grand Prix of Poland
1st Team pursuit (with Edyta Jasińska, Natalia Rutkowska and Małgorzata Wojtyra)
3rd Omnium
 UEC European Track Championships
2nd  Team pursuit
3rd  Points race
2017
 1st  Omnium, National Track Championships
 Grand Prix Minsk
1st Points race
2nd Omnium
 3rd  Points race, UEC European Track Championships
 3rd Points race, Grand Prix Poland

References

External links
 
 
 
 
 
 
 
 

1989 births
Living people
Polish female cyclists
Olympic cyclists of Poland
Cyclists at the 2012 Summer Olympics
UCI Track Cycling World Champions (women)
People from Ostrów Wielkopolski County
Sportspeople from Greater Poland Voivodeship
Polish track cyclists
Cyclists at the 2019 European Games
European Games medalists in cycling
European Games bronze medalists for Poland
21st-century Polish women